Federal Highway 176 (Carretera Federal 176) is a Federal Highway of Mexico. The highway travels from Tizimín, Yucatán in the east to Mérida, Yucatán in the west.

References

176